Tony B. Jackson (November 7, 1942 – October 28, 2005) was an American professional basketball player.

Jackson was born in the borough of Brooklyn in New York City. A standout player under coach Joe Lapchick at St. John's University from 1958 to 1961, Jackson was six feet, four inches tall and played two seasons in the American Basketball League and two seasons in the American Basketball Association. Jackson scored 53 points (including 12 three-point baskets) while playing for the Chicago Majors of the ABL on March 14, 1962.  He died of cancer in 2005 in Brooklyn.

Jackson, Connie Hawkins, Doug Moe, and Roger Brown were indicted in the 1962 NCAA basketball point shaving scandals involving Jack Molinas and banned from the NBA for life by then-NBA commissioner Walter Kennedy.
Jackson participated in the 1968 ABA All-Star Game and holds the ABA record for free throws in a single game with 24.

References 

1942 births
2005 deaths
All-American college men's basketball players
Amateur Athletic Union men's basketball players
American men's basketball players
Deaths from cancer in New York (state)
Chicago Majors players
College basketball controversies in the United States
Houston Mavericks players
Minnesota Pipers players
New Jersey Americans players
New York Knicks draft picks
New York Nets players
Parade High School All-Americans (boys' basketball)
Shooting guards
Small forwards
Sportspeople from Brooklyn
Basketball players from New York City
St. John's Red Storm men's basketball players
Thomas Jefferson High School (Brooklyn) alumni